Cromac is a commune in the Haute-Vienne department in the Nouvelle-Aquitaine region in western France.

Geography
The river Benaize forms part of the commune's south-eastern border, flows through the commune, then forms part of the commune's south-western border.

Inhabitants are known as Cromacois.

See also
Communes of the Haute-Vienne department

References

Communes of Haute-Vienne